Richard Leslie Hill (18 February 1901 – 21 March 1996) was an English civil servant and historian of Sudan, "one of the great pioneers in the study of the modern history of the Sudan". Lecturer in Near Eastern history at Durham University from 1949 to 1966, he established the Sudan Archive there, "one of the most remarkable initiatives by any British university".

Works
Hill's books fall into three main classes: reference works, editions of 19th-century memoirs or travel journals, and synthesising monographs.
 Toryism and the people, 1832-1846, 1929
 A bibliography of the Anglo-Egyptian Sudan, from the earliest times to 1937, 1939
 A biographical dictionary of the Sudan, 1951. 2nd ed., 1967
 Egypt in the Sudan, 1820-1881, 1959
 Slatin Pasha, 1965
 Sudan transport; a history of railway, marine and river services in the Republic of the Sudan, 1965
 (ed.) On the frontiers of Islam: two manuscripts concerning the Sudan under Turco-Egyptian rule, 1822-1845, 1970
 (ed. with Elias Toniolo) The Opening of the Nile Basin: writings by members of the Catholic Mission to Central Africa on the geography and ethnography of the Sudan, 1842-1881, 1975
 (tr. and ed. with Paul Santi) The Europeans in the Sudan, 1834-1878: some manuscripts, mostly unpublished, 1980
 (ed.) The Sudan memoirs of Carl Christian Giegler Pasha, 1873-1883, 1984.
 (with Peter C. Hogg) A Black corps d'élite: an Egyptian Sudanese conscript battalion with the French Army in Mexico, 1863–1867, and its survivors in subsequent African history'', 1994

References

1901 births
1996 deaths
English civil servants
British colonial governors and administrators in Africa
Historians of Africa
History of Sudan
20th-century English historians
Anglo-Egyptian Sudan people
Alumni of St Edmund Hall, Oxford